The Order of the Colonial Empire (Portuguese:"Ordem do Império Colonial") was a Portuguese Order (decoration), established on 13 April 1932 as a colonial order of knighthood, to reward services by soldiers and civilians in the Portuguese colonies in Asia and Africa. It was discontinued after the Carnation Revolution in 1974.<ref>"Ordens Nacionais", Ordens Honoríficas Portuguesas" (Office of the President of Portugal; in Portuguese). Retrieved 19 February 2019.</ref>Source for the list: "Entidades Nacionais Agraciadas com Ordens Portuguesas", Ordens Honoríficas Portuguesas'' (Office of the President of Portugal). Retrieved 19 February 2019.

Portuguese recipients

Foreign recipients

References 

Orders, decorations, and medals of Portugal